KBNF-LP (101.3 FM, "101.3 KBNF") is a radio station broadcasting a 1980s classic hits format. it is licensed to Ruston, Louisiana, it owned by Lincoln Parish Schools Aka Ruston High School.

External links

Classic rock radio stations in the United States
Radio stations established in 2014
Radio stations in Louisiana
Radio stations in Ruston, Louisiana
2014 establishments in Louisiana